Fred Mogaka Tumbo (born 18 June 1978) is a Kenyan long-distance runner who specializes in the marathon.

In 2006 he won the silver medal in the marathon at the Commonwealth Games, and finished seventeenth at the inaugural World Road Running Championships.

His personal best time in the half marathon is 1:01:14 hours, achieved in March 2004 in Paris; and his personal best time in the marathon is 2:12:03 hours, achieved at the 2006 Commonwealth Games.

Achievements

References

1978 births
Living people
Kenyan male long-distance runners
Athletes (track and field) at the 2006 Commonwealth Games
Commonwealth Games medallists in athletics
Commonwealth Games silver medallists for Kenya
Medallists at the 2006 Commonwealth Games